hedgehog lab is a global digital product consultancy headquartered in Newcastle upon Tyne, with additional offices in the United States, and Bulgaria.

The company, which employs more than 120 people, concentrates on building mobile and web apps for smartphones and other connected devices and has in-house capabilities in Artificial Intelligence and Machine Learning. In recent years, it has experienced rapid turnover growth, with global revenues rising to £5m in 2019 and the company being named as one of the fastest-growing businesses in Europe for three years running.

In 2021 it was named Clutch #1 Global Mobile App Developers and Large UK App Agency of the Year by the UK App Awards and in 2022 the business was named to the Best Workplaces in UK by Great Place to Work.

hedgehog lab takes its name from Jim Collins’ book Good to Great, which features the ‘hedgehog concept’ of cultivating ‘piercing clarity’ in the pursuit of being great at one thing to achieve long-term results.

History
hedgehog lab founders, Sarat Pediredla and Mark Forster met while working as developers at a Newcastle-based digital agency. After leaving to launch their own business, they created a tool for the financial services sector and soon generated interest in their software-as-a-service offering.

Plans, however, were disrupted by the 2008 financial crisis, at which point hedgehog lab switched to a digital agency model. This was later refined to focus on ‘post-PC’ technologies, with the company looking internationally to grow market reach while still a micro-business. After launching sites in London and India, it turned its attention to the US, opening an office in Boston in April 2015.

Having secured £1m of investment from Maven Capital Partners - one of the UK's most active equity houses -  hedgehog lab now plans to grow revenues by at least 50% year-on-year until 2020. The investment was used to increase the company's delivery capabilities, helped to grow its sales and marketing functions, and allowed the business to move into larger premises to support its growing international headcount.

hedgehog lab secured a further £900k investment from Maven Capital Partners in 2020 to support its work with its international client base and further grow headcount. As part of the investment, experienced tech advisor Charles Andrews, who has previously held positions at IBM and Globant, joined the business as chairman.

Awards/recognition
 2022 Best Workplaces in UK by Great Place to Work 
 2022 Clutch #1 UK Top B2B Companies
 2021 UK App Awards, Large UK App Agency of the Year 
 2021 Clutch #3 Global Enterprise App Modernization
 2021 Clutch #2 Top 1000 Service Providers
 2021 Clutch #1 Global Mobile App Developers
 2021 Clutch #1 Global iPhone App Developers
 2021 Clutch #7 Global Android App Developers
 2021 Clutch #1 Global Web Developers
 2021 Clutch #2 Top Android App Developers
 2021 Clutch #1 iPhone & iOS App Developers
 2021 Prolific North Top 50 Digital Agencies 
 2020 Prolific North Top 50 Digital Agencies 
 2019 Prolific North Top 50 Digital Agencies

References

External links
 hedgehog lab
 The prickly business of app development
 Small business in the spotlight ... Hedgehog Lab
 Newcastle tech company Hedgehog Lab set for three years of 100% growth

Mobile software
Companies based in Newcastle upon Tyne